Boisot is a surname. Notable people with the surname include:

Georges Boisot (1774-1853), Chancellor of the Swiss State
Jean-Baptiste Boisot (1638–1694), French abbot, bibliophile and scholar
Louis Boisot (1856–1933), American banker
Max Boisot (1943–2011), British architect and management consultant